The Wheat City Arena was an indoor arena located in Brandon, Manitoba at the corner of 10th Street and Victoria Avenue. It was built in 1913 and hosted the Royal Manitoba Winter Fair as well as numerous ice hockey teams, including the Brandon Wheat Kings of the MJHL, SJHL, and Western Hockey League. It was demolished in 1969 and replaced with a Safeway store that has since closed and been replaced by the new headquarters for the City of Brandon Police.

External links
 Article from Brandon Sun newspaper

PDF to the book The Wheat City: A Pictorial View of Brandon by Fred McGuinness 

Defunct indoor ice hockey venues in Canada
Sports venues in Brandon, Manitoba
Western Hockey League arenas
Indoor arenas in Manitoba
Sports venues demolished in 1969
Demolished buildings and structures in Canada
1913 establishments in Manitoba
1969 disestablishments in Manitoba
Sports venues completed in 1913
Ice hockey in Brandon, Manitoba